Deniz Manuel Bozkurt (born July 23, 1993) is a retired Turkish-born Puerto Rican footballer. He most recently played for Boca Raton FC and for the Puerto Rico national football team.

Career
Bozkurt started his career in the United States' college system with the Florida Atlantic Owls where he stood out as a player, scoring 6 goals in 37 appearances over 3 seasons, earning him a call up to the Puerto Rico U20s for the 2013 CONCACAF U-20 Championship. In early 2015 he traveled to Germany for a trial with VfL Wolfsburg.

International career
Bozkurt was called up to the  Puerto Rico U20s in 2012 whilst playing for Florida Atlantic Owlsfor the 2013 CONCACAF U-20 Championship qualifying match against Barbados U20s. He received his first full national cap for Puerto Rico in 2015 in a friendly against Canada as a substitute in the 36th minute.

His first goal for Puerto Rico came during second round qualifications for he 2018 FIFA World Cup in a first-leg tie over Grenada in which Bozkurt's goal gave the Puerto Ricans a 1-0 victory.

International goals
Scores and results list Puerto Rico's  goal tally first.

References

External links
 

1993 births
Living people
Puerto Rican footballers
Puerto Rico international footballers
Florida Atlantic Owls men's soccer players
Floridians FC players
American people of Puerto Rican descent
American people of Turkish descent
People from Plantation, Florida
Soccer players from Florida
USL League Two players
Association football midfielders
Boca Raton FC players
Sportspeople from Broward County, Florida